Waterea is a genus of South Pacific intertidal spiders containing the single species, Waterea cornigera. It was  first described by Raymond Robert Forster & C. L. Wilton in 1973, and has only been found in New Zealand.

References

Desidae
Monotypic Araneomorphae genera
Spiders of New Zealand
Taxa named by Raymond Robert Forster